Ranjangaon Mashid is a village in Parner taluka in Ahmednagar district of state of Maharashtra, India.

Religion
Majority of the village dwellers are Hindu Marathas, Hindu Mali,Hindu chambhar along with smaller communities of Buddhists, Marwadis with few population of Muslims. Many peoples are found Bhill tribal community in middle of village.

Economy
The majority of the population has farming as their primary occupation.
Trade is mostly dependent on farming of cash crops & milk.

See also
 Parner taluka
 Villages in Parner taluka
Railway :
Ranjangaon Road railway station is connected to cities like Shrigonda, Nagar , Daund & directly connected from Ahmadnagar through passenger trains. There are daily passenger shuttle services between Ahmadnagar to Ranjangaon.

Road :
Ranjangaon is connected to Supa, it is one of the primary destinations on this Ahmadnagar-Pune highway.
Ranjangaon is directly connected with Shrigonda, Shirur, Parner & Nagar Taluka.

Late Ankush Jawak was a Legendary Soldier of Village. Subhedar Prataprao Deshmukh is a first military soldier from village & he participated in 1971 war against Pakistan.

A popular location of Village are; Muktabai Temple, Hanuman Temple, Sawata Mali Temple Dhadgevadi,Saibaba Temple,Munjoba Temple, zutumshaha wali baba Dargha hangeshwar Mala. Gunmal, Lake 1, Lake 2, Railway Station, Kumjai, bhairavnath temple,Bajartal.

School :
Shree Shivaji Vidhyalaya. There are two residential schools being established in the Village. It is more than thirty years old, and is known for its high quality education. CA Raj Deshmukh is one of Chartered Accountant from Ranjangaon, who is practising in Pune. And "Mr Nilesh Deshmukh" is first MPSC qualifier from Ranjangaon, he is currently ACP/DySP.

Key People Nirwan,Dhadage, Jawak, 
Deshmukh, Bankar,Sabale, Kale,Mehetre, Shinde, Yadav - Ikade, Gaikwad _ Gadhave, lonkar, Sayyad, mulani, manyar, tambuli, Pawar, kadam, are some common families in Village.
Every important decision about village is taken by Advise of all people from last few days. Before this condition is something different.

References 

Villages in Parner taluka
Villages in Ahmednagar district